Maaris Meier (born 22 May 1983) is a Mountain bike rider and road cyclist from Estonia. She represented her nation at the 2004 Summer Olympics in the women's road race. She won the silver medal at the 2008 World University Cycling Championship in the Cross-country.

References

External links
 Official website

Estonian female cyclists
Cyclists at the 2004 Summer Olympics
Olympic cyclists of Estonia
Living people
Sportspeople from Tallinn
1983 births
Cyclists at the 2015 European Games
European Games competitors for Estonia
Universiade medalists in cycling
Universiade silver medalists for Estonia
Medalists at the 2011 Summer Universiade